Carlos Fernandes may refer to:

Carlos Fernandes (footballer, born 1979), Carlos Alberto Fernandes, Portuguese-Angolan football goalkeeper
Carlos Fernandes (footballer, born 1978), Carlos Miguel Brandão Fernandes, Portuguese football defender
Carlos Fernandes (tennis), Brazilian tennis player of the 1950s and 1960s
Carlos Nicholas Fernandes, Singaporean inventor, entrepreneur and public policy advisor

See also 
Carlos Fernández (disambiguation)
José Carlos Fernández (disambiguation)